The 1997 Afro-Asian Club Championship, was the 10th Afro-Asian Club Championship competition endorsed by the Confederation of African Football (CAF) and Asian Football Confederation (AFC), contested between the winners of the African Champions' Cup and the Asian Club Championship.

The final was contested in two-legged home-and-away format between Korean team Pohang Steel the 1996–97 Asian Club Championship winner. and Egyptian team Zamalek, the 1996 African Cup of Champions Clubs winner, The first leg was hosted by Pohang Steel at the Pohang Steel Yard in Pohang on 16 November 1997, while the second leg was hosted by Zamalek at Cairo Stadium in Cairo on 5 December 1997.

Aggregate was 2–2, Zamalek won on away goals, became the first (and only) club to win the Championship for 2 times.

Teams

Match details

First leg

Second leg

References

External links
 http://www.angelfire.com/ak/EgyptianSports/ZamalekAfroAsian.html#1997
 
 http://www.goalzz.com/main.aspx?c=5515
 https://www.youtube.com/watch?v=8VoaIDx0GRU&list=TLo3J9cwtI9iwxvvobrdUITlfa5lBCGDNq

1997
1997 in African football
1997 in Asian football
Zamalek SC matches
Pohang Steelers matches
1997–98 in Egyptian football
1997 in South Korean football
November 1997 sports events in Asia
December 1997 sports events in Africa
International club association football competitions hosted by Egypt
International club association football competitions hosted by South Korea